Oxford is a surname. Notable people with the surname include:

 Edward Oxford, who attempted to kill Queen Victoria
 Harry E. Oxford (1866–1915), American politician
 Ken Oxford (1929–1993), British footballer
 Kenneth Oxford (1924–1998), senior British police officer
 John Oxford (born 1942), English virologist

English toponymic surnames